TABU Ultra Lounge opened in Las Vegas at the MGM Grand in 2004 and closed in April 2013. It was a  venue with a capacity of 350 people.
It won the "Best Lounge" from Club Systems International's prestigious Club World Awards in 2004, 2005 and 2006, "Best Lounge" and "Best Bottle Service" by the 2009 Club World Awards, as well as the "Best Ultra Lounge – staff pick" by Las Vegas Weekly's "Vegas Best of 2009". Music Director and Resident DJ Jose 2 Hype from the opening in 2004 - 2009

References

Defunct nightclubs in the Las Vegas Valley
Event venues established in 1997
MGM Grand Las Vegas